Evanson is a surname. Notable people with the surname include:

 Edith Evanson (1896–1980), American actress
 Edward Evanson (1731–1805), English clergyman
 John Evanson (born 1947), English footballer
 Patrick Evanson (born 1933), Antiguan cricketer

See also
 Evanson, Kentucky